Joshua is a Biblical figure, the central character of the Book of Joshua. The name may also refer to:

People
 Joshua the High Priest, a biblical figure described in the Book of Zechariah
 Joshua (name), a list of other people with the given name
 Joshua (record producer) (born 1971), Danish music producer
 Joshua (surname)

Music
 Joshua (Handel), a 1747 oratorio by George Frideric Handel
 Joshua (band), a metal band fronted by Joshua Perahia
 Joshua (album), a 1971 album by Dolly Parton
"Joshua" (song), the title song
 "Joshua" (jazz standard), a 1963 composition by Victor Feldman

Film and television
 Joshua (1976 film), a Western film
 Joshua (2002 film), based upon the 1983 novel (see below)
 Joshua, a 2005 Nigerian film by Adim Williams
 Joshua (2007 film), a psychological horror film
 Joshua (2020 film), a Malayalam psychological film
 Joshua, the artificial intelligence in the film WarGames
 Joshua, a character in the TV series Dark Angel
 "Joshua" (Space Ghost Coast to Coast), a television episode

Other uses
 Joshua, Texas, United States, a city
 Joshua (novel), a 1983 novel by Joseph Girzone
 Joshua (video game), an unlicensed NES video game from 1992 produced by Panther Software
 Joshua, sailing ketch in which Bernard Moitessier and his wife Françoise made the longest nonstop passage by a yacht in history

See also
 Yehoshua (disambiguation)
 Jesus (name)
 Jehoshua
 Jeshua (disambiguation)
 Iyasu (disambiguation), the Ge'ez equivalent used by Ethiopian Emperors
 Josue (disambiguation)